The Order of the White Eagle may refer to: 

Order of the White Eagle (Poland)
Order of the White Eagle (Russian Empire)
Order of the White Eagle (Serbia)

See also 
 Order of the Eagle (disambiguation)